is a railway station on the Ainokaze Toyama Railway Line in the city of Imizu, Toyama Prefecture, Japan, operated by the third-sector railway operator Ainokaze Toyama Railway. It is also a freight terminal for the Japan Freight Railway Company.

Lines

Station layout
Etchū-Daimon Station has one side platform and one island platform connected by a footbridge. The station is staffed.

Platforms

History
Etchū-Daimon Station opened on 15 October 1923 as a station on the Japanese Government Railway (JGR). It was privatized on 1 April 1984, becoming a station on JR West.

From this date, Etchū-Daimon Station was transferred to the ownership of the third-sector operating company Ainokaze Toyama Railway.

Adjacent stations

Passenger statistics
In fiscal 2015, the station was used by an average of 903 passengers daily (boarding passengers only).

Surrounding area
 former Daimon Town Hall
 former Oshima Town Hall

See also
 List of railway stations in Japan

References

External links

  

Railway stations in Toyama Prefecture
Railway stations in Japan opened in 1923
Ainokaze Toyama Railway Line
Stations of Japan Freight Railway Company
Imizu, Toyama